Matti Veikko Lampainen (born January 16, 1932) is a retired professional ice hockey player who played in the SM-liiga. He was born in Kanneljärvi, Finland (now Pobeda, Leningrad Oblast, Russia). He played for Tappara and Ilves. He was inducted into the Finnish Hockey Hall of Fame in 1985.

External links
 
 Finnish Hockey Hall of Fame bio

1932 births
Living people
Finnish ice hockey players
Ilves players
Karhut Pori players
Tappara players
Olympic ice hockey players of Finland
Ice hockey players at the 1960 Winter Olympics